Edrick Bertholan Floréal (born October 5, 1966 in Gonaïves, Haiti) is a track and field coach for the Texas Longhorns men's track and field and women's track and field program and retired long and triple jumper from Canada.

Career

Athletics career 
Floréal finished fourth in the triple jump at the 1987 Pan American Games. He represented Canada at two consecutive Summer Olympics, starting in 1988. At the 1988 Summer Olympics, he finished 18th in the qualifying round of the Triple Jump; at the 1992 Summer Olympics, he finished 28th in the qualifying round in the Long Jump.

Floréal competed collegiately for the University of Arkansas, a school fabled for its jumping prowess. He won the NCAA Men's Indoor Track and Field Championships triple jump in both 1989 and 1990 and at the Outdoor Championships in 1988, 1989 and 1990.

Coaching career 
Floréal was the director of track and field at Stanford University from 1998 to 2012. He was named the "West Regional Coach of the Year" for the 2010 indoor season by the United States Track & Field and Cross Country Coaches Association (USTFCCCA).

Floréal was signed as the head coach of the University of Kentucky men and women's cross country and track teams on July 9, 2012.

Floréal was named Head Track and Field Coach at the University of Texas in June 2018.

Personal life 
Floréal is married to LaVonna Martin-Floreal, the 1992 Olympic silver medalist in the 100-meter hurdles. They have two children, one of whom, E.J., played three seasons for the Kentucky Wildcats men's basketball team before leaving the program in August 2016 to join the UK track program full-time.

International competitions

References

External links
 
 
 
 
 
 

1966 births
Living people
People from Gonaïves
Canadian male long jumpers
Canadian male triple jumpers
Haitian male athletes
Canadian track and field coaches
American track and field coaches
Olympic male long jumpers
Olympic male triple jumpers
Olympic track and field athletes of Canada
Athletes (track and field) at the 1988 Summer Olympics
Athletes (track and field) at the 1992 Summer Olympics
Commonwealth Games bronze medallists for Canada
Commonwealth Games medallists in athletics
Athletes (track and field) at the 1986 Commonwealth Games
Athletes (track and field) at the 1990 Commonwealth Games
Athletes (track and field) at the 1994 Commonwealth Games
Pan American Games track and field athletes for Canada
Athletes (track and field) at the 1987 Pan American Games
Competitors at the 1990 Goodwill Games
World Athletics Championships athletes for Canada
Japan Championships in Athletics winners
Arkansas Razorbacks men's track and field athletes
Kentucky Wildcats track and field coaches
Kentucky Wildcats cross country coaches
Stanford Cardinal track and field coaches
Stanford Cardinal cross country coaches
Black Canadian track and field athletes
Haitian Quebecers
Canadian expatriate sportspeople in the United States
Haitian emigrants to Canada
Naturalized citizens of Canada
Medallists at the 1990 Commonwealth Games